The Rugby Federation of Armenia is the governing body for rugby union in Armenia.

It was founded in 2000 and joined FIRA-AER (now Rugby Europe) as an associate member in 2002. Rugby Europe suspended the Rugby Federation of Armenia in November 2014 due to inactivity.

History
Rugby was first played in the country in the 1960s, when Armenia was a republic within the Soviet Union. Armenia had its own representative team within the USSR, although it was not considered to be a proper national side. Armenian clubs including Yerevan Dinamo RC and Yerevan Spartak RC played in the top division of Soviet Championship and Soviet Cup. The rugby teams were disbanded due to the effects of the first Nagorno-Karabakh War and economic difficulties in Armenia during first years of independence in the early 1990s.

Rugby in Armenia went into hibernation for almost a decade until the founding of the Rugby Federation of Armenia (RFA) in 2000. Gagik Panikian become the RFA president in 2002 and the RFA joined FIRA-AER (now Rugby Europe) later that year. National teams for sevens and fifteen-a-side were soon formed to play in European competitions.

As of 2012, there were three rugby clubs in Armenia: Ararat, Artashat, and Ureni. Rugby Europe suspended the Rugby Federation of Armenia due to inactivity in 2014.

National teams
Armenia - the national men's rugby union team was formed in 2004 and was largely drawn from players of Armenian heritage in France.
Armenia 7s - the national men's rugby union seven-a-side team was formed in 2003.

See also
Armenia national rugby union team
Rugby union in Armenia

References

External links
Official site:
 
 Rugby Federation of Armenia 

Other sites:
 Armenian Rugby Supporters website (Հայերեն, in English, на Русском) 
 Archives du Rugby: Armenie

Rugby union in Armenia
Sports governing bodies in Armenia
Armenia
Sports organizations established in 2000